Nine Hundred Nights is a 2001 documentary film of the psychedelic band Big Brother and The Holding Company, directed by Michael Burlingame.

External links 
 
Official website

2001 films
American documentary films
Rockumentaries
2001 documentary films
2000s American films